Maccabi Tel Aviv are an Israeli football club which are based in Tel Aviv. During the 2013–14 campaign the club have competed in the Israeli Premier League, State Cup, UEFA Champions League and UEFA Europa League.

Squad
As of 12 March 2014

First Team

Transfers

Summer 2013

In:

Out:

Winter 2013–14

In:

Out:

Matches

Pre-season friendlies

UEFA Champions League

Second qualifying round

Maccabi Tel Aviv won 4–1 on aggregate.

Third qualifying round

Basel won 4–3 on aggregate.

UEFA Europa League

Play-off round

On 14 August 2013, Metalist Kharkiv were disqualified from the 2013–14 UEFA club competitions because of previous match-fixing. UEFA decided to replace Metalist Kharkiv in the Champions League play-off round with PAOK, who were eliminated by Metalist Kharkiv in the third qualifying round. Thus, Maccabi Tel Aviv, the opponent of PAOK in the Europa League play-off round, qualified directly for the Europa League group stage.

Group stage

Round of 32

Basel won 3–0 on aggregate.

Israel State Cup

Round of 32

Israeli Premier League

Israeli Premier League Championship Round

References

Maccabi Tel Aviv F.C. seasons
Israeli football clubs 2013–14 season
maccabi